Oscar Peter Snyder (January 6, 1895 – February 21, 1983) was a United States Army major general who served in the Army Medical Department as a Chief of the U.S. Army Dental Corps from 1954 to 1956.

Biography

World War I
Oscar Peter Snyder was born to Emil and Anna (ńee Marchand) Snyder on 6 January 1895 near Millersburg, Holmes County, Ohio. He attended the Orrsville public schools graduating in 1912. He entered The Ohio State University College of Dentistry and graduated with the degree of Doctor of Dental Surgery in June 1916. He was commissioned a first lieutenant in the Regular Army on 24 October 1916. He first served at Columbus Barracks, Ohio until 18 December 1916 when he was transferred to Fort McIntosh, Laredo, Texas as Camp Hospital Dental Surgeon. In June 1917 Snyder was transferred to Fort McPherson, Georgia and then to Camp Hancock, Georgia as the 28th Infantry Division Dental Surgeon. The 28th Division was sent to France in May 1918 with the American Expeditionary Forces (AEF) where Snyder participated in the Marne Defensive, the Marne Offensive, Oise-Aisne Offensive and the Meuse-Argonne Offensive. He returned to the United States on 20 July 1919.

1920s and 1930s
He was assigned to Camp Dodge, Iowa with temporary duty in Illinois, Wisconsin and Michigan. In September 1922 he was transferred to Fort Sheridan, Illinois where he met and married Louise McDonald in May 1923. In August 1924 he was sent to Camp Stotsenberg in the Philippines then to Sternberg General Hospital in Manila. His first child, Jane Louise Snyder, was born on 6 January 1927 and the family returned to the United States in April. Oscar P. 'Peter' Snyder Jr was born on 23 February 1930 while Snyder was assigned to Walter Reed General Hospital. In June 1931 he was transferred to Fort Thomas, Kentucky as Post Dental Surgeon. In August 1935 he enrolled in the Army Dental School and graduated from the Postgraduate Course in February 1936 and in August was transferred to the United States Military Academy, West Point, New York.

World War II
In April 1941 he reported to Lawson General Hospital, Atlanta, Georgia, and was sent to Melbourne, Australia on 12 April 1942 as Chief Dental Surgeon, Southwest Pacific Theater, Office of the Surgeon General. Snyder returned from the Pacific Theater in December 1944 and served at England General Hospital, Atlantic City, New Jersey until June 1945. Beginning in July 1945 he was Chief of the Dental Service at Fitzsimons General Hospital near Denver, Colorado.

Post-World War II
On 27 April 1948 he was transferred to Walter Reed Army Medical Center as Director of Dental Activities. In April 1953 he was transferred to Headquarters, Brooke Army Medical Center at Fort Sam Houston, Texas, as Director of Dental Activities. In April 1954 he was confirmed as Chief of the Army Dental Corps and Assistant to the Surgeon General, assuming command on 1 May 1954. This assignment ended upon his retirement from the U.S. Army on 30 November 1956.

Retirement
After retiring from the military Snyder taught at the Ohio State University College of Dentistry from January 1957 to June 1965. He died on 22 February 1983 in Columbus, Ohio.

Awards and decorations

Promotions
Commissioned a first lieutenant on 24 Oct 1916, to major on 6 October 1917**, to lieutenant colonel 27 October 1936, to colonel-temporary 26 June 1941, permanent-27 October 1942, brigadier general-permanent 27 April 1948, major general-temporary and permanent on 12 April 1954.

Notes
 *A hand written note and photocopied baptismal certificate state that Snyder was born on 6 September 1895. When he enlisted in the Army the recruiter changed the date to 6 January and it was used on all official documents and celebrated on that date.
 **Due to legislation issued by Congress (H.R. 4897, 6 October 1917), which gave Dental Corps officers the same status as Medical Corps officers, Snyder never served in the rank of a captain.

References
 Oscar P. Snyder Collection Finding Aid available at the US Army Heritage & Education Center, Carlisle, Pennsylvania
 Chiefs of the US Army Dental Corps Borden Institute

1895 births
1983 deaths
American dentists
American dentistry academics
Ohio State University faculty
Ohio State University College of Dentistry alumni
United States Army generals
United States Army Medical Corps officers
United States Army personnel of World War I
United States Army personnel of World War II
Recipients of the Legion of Merit
People from Millersburg, Ohio
20th-century dentists